The Black Wolf is a horror novel by Galad Elflandsson.  It was first published in hardcover by Donald M. Grant, Publisher, Inc. in 1979, in an edition of 1,020 copies.  The novel was reprinted in paperback by Centaur Books in 1980.

Plot introduction
The novel is a Lovecraftian story of werewolves.

Reception
The book was reviewed by Richard E. Geis in Science Fiction Review, v. 9, no. 2, May 1980, Baird Searles in Isaac Asimov's Science Fiction Magazine, v. 4, no. 11, November 1980, and Wayne C. Rogers in Fantasy Mongers no. 10, Spring 1984.

Notes

References

1979 Canadian novels
American horror novels
Werewolf novels
Donald M. Grant, Publisher books